The Pingat Berkebolehan (Tentera) is a decoration awarded to any member of the Singapore Armed Forces who has clearly demonstrated exceptional efficiency, devotion to duty, or produced work of special significance. The candidate is also one who has shown initiative, thoroughness, and resourcefulness in their work.

The Pingat Berkebolehan is the civil equivalent award.

Description
 The ribbon is purple with a white central stripe and white edges.

References
MINDEF Singapore Medals factsheet page
World Medals Pingat Berkebolehan (Tentera) page

Military awards and decorations of Singapore